A listing of the various ski runs in the Sierra Nevada Ski Area in the Sierra Nevada mountains in the province of Granada in southeastern Spain.

Ski Run Classifications

Ski Lifts

Ski Run Listing

External links
 http://sierranevada.es/es/invierno/la-estaci%C3%B3n/parte-nieve/

Ski areas and resorts in Spain